Teen Wolf Too is a 1987 American fantasy comedy film directed by Christopher Leitch, written by R. Timothy Kring, and starring Jason Bateman (film debut), James Hampton, John Astin and Kim Darby. It is the sequel to Teen Wolf (1985).

Plot
Todd Howard (Jason Bateman), the cousin of Scott Howard, has recently been accepted into Hamilton University on a full athletic scholarship on the recommendation of Coach Bobby Finstock (Paul Sand), who was Scott's basketball coach at Beacontown High. Finstock's hope is that Todd has the family genes to become a werewolf and turn his new struggling boxing team into championship contenders.

Having never been very good at sports, and because he is more interested in being a veterinarian, Todd is certain that Finstock has the wrong guy. During a meet and greet reception of school alumni, he has his first "wolf-out" while dancing with a seductive hostess.

At first, Todd is horrified by his "family affliction", and fellow students begin to harass him. Then, during his first boxing match, after nearly getting knocked out, Todd has his second "wolf-out" only this time he is able to display his supernatural agility and strength and has a dramatic come from behind victory, thus earning the admiration of the students as well as the strict Dean Dunn (John Astin).

With his newfound fame comes girls, top grades and even a car from the dean but as the year goes on, Todd realizes that he is losing his friends and self-respect. He seeks advice from his uncle, Scott's father, Harold Howard (James Hampton), who helps him come to terms with his responsibilities and prepares him for the championship. Todd also reconnects with his girlfriend, Nicki (Estee Chandler), who helps him regain his focus on being humble.

Todd then decides that he will fight his championship match against Steve "Gus" Gustavson (Robert Neary), who he had prior issues with, as himself rather than the wolf much to the dismay of all except his uncle, girlfriend and Professor Tanya Brooks (Kim Darby). Brooks, who unbeknownst to Todd is also a werewolf, intimidates Dean Dunn with glowing red eyes, growling, and swaying her tail.

After losing round after round, and nearly getting knocked out, Todd is tempted to become the wolf until he sees Nicki mouth the words "I love you" to him. This gives him the strength to overcome Gus and knocks him out to a roaring ovation.

Cast

Production
James Hampton and Mark Holton are the only actors to reprise their roles from Teen Wolf (1985), as Harold Howard and Chubby respectively. The characters of Coach Finstock and Stiles returned for the sequel but were re-cast with Paul Sand as Finstock and Stuart Fratkin as Stiles.  Principal photography began in June 1987 and shot on location at Claremont Colleges in Claremont, California.

Reception
Teen Wolf Too received near-universally negative reviews from critics. The film holds an 8% rating on Rotten Tomatoes based on 24 reviews. On Metacritic, the film has an 8 out of 100 rating based on 5 critics, indicating "overwhelming dislike".

On their show, Gene Siskel and Roger Ebert specifically gave the film two emphatic thumbs down, with Ebert complaining that they had picked, along with Date with an Angel, the two worst films possible to be released on the same day.

References

External links
 
 
 
 

Teen Wolf
1980s English-language films
1987 films
1987 comedy films
1980s fantasy comedy films
1987 independent films
1980s sports comedy films
1980s teen comedy films
American fantasy comedy films
American independent films
American sequel films
American sports comedy films
American teen comedy films
Atlantic Entertainment Group films
American boxing films
Films about shapeshifting
Films set in universities and colleges
American werewolf films
Films with screenplays by Jeph Loeb
Films directed by Christopher Leitch
1980s American films